Roger Fabricio Rojas Lazo (born 9 June 1990), nicknamed RoRo, is a Honduran professional footballer for Costa Rican club Sporting San José.

Due to his style of play, has been compared to Wilmer Velásquez.

Club career
Born in Tegucigalpa, Rojas plays as a striker for Olimpia. In April 2013, he scored his 50th league goal against Platense aged 22, making him the youngest player to reach the milestone and surpassing national team striker Jerry Bengtson who was 24 when he scored his 50th.

Al-Ettifaq
In July 2014, Rojas was loaned to Saudi Arabian side Ettifaq for a year. and scored his first goal in Crown Prince Cup against Al Mojzel.

Necaxa
In January 2015, Rojas was loaned to Mexican side Necaxa for six months.

Sabah
On 20 August 2019, Rojas signed a one-year contract with Azerbaijan Premier League side Sabah FC. On 26 December 2019, Rojas left Sabah by mutual consent.

Tolima
Following his departure from Sabah, Rojas was signed by Deportes Tolima at the request of head coach Hernán Torres, his former Alajuelense coach.

International career
He represented Honduras in the 2009 FIFA U-20 World Cup.

Rojas made his senior debut against El Salvador on 5 September 2010, scoring his first goal in the process. This goal also meant that Rojas became the youngest ever goal scorer in the Honduras national team's history.

International goals
Scores and results list Honduras' goal tally first.

Honours

C.D. Olimpia
Liga Profesional de Honduras (6): 2009–10 C, 2011–12 A, 2011–12 C, 2012–13 A, 2012–13 C, 2013–14 C
CONCACAF League: 2017

Individual
CONCACAF League Team of the Tournament: 2017
CONCACAF League Golden Boot: 2017

References

External links

 

1990 births
Living people
Sportspeople from Tegucigalpa
Association football forwards
Honduran footballers
Honduras international footballers
C.D. Olimpia players
Ettifaq FC players
L.D. Alajuelense footballers
Sabah FC (Azerbaijan) players
Deportes Tolima footballers
C.S. Cartaginés players
Liga Nacional de Fútbol Profesional de Honduras players
Saudi First Division League players
Azerbaijan Premier League players
Categoría Primera A players
Liga FPD players
2013 Copa Centroamericana players
2013 CONCACAF Gold Cup players
Honduran expatriate footballers
Honduran expatriate sportspeople in Saudi Arabia
Expatriate footballers in Saudi Arabia
Honduran expatriate sportspeople in Mexico
Expatriate footballers in Mexico
Honduran expatriate sportspeople in Costa Rica
Expatriate footballers in Costa Rica
Honduran expatriate sportspeople in Azerbaijan
Expatriate footballers in Azerbaijan
Honduran expatriate sportspeople in Colombia
Expatriate footballers in Colombia